Hirvepark is a park in Tallinn, Estonia.

On 23 August 1987, the anti-Soviet Hirvepark meeting took place in the park.

Hirvepark is one of the most biodiverse parks in Estonia in consideration of its variety of tree species.

References

External links
 

Parks in Estonia
Geography of Tallinn
Tallinn Old Town